Aurantimonas manganoxydans is a Gram-negative, catalase- and oxidase-positive, non-spore-forming, motile bacteria from the genus of Aurantimonas which has the ability to oxidize Manganese. Aurantimonas manganoxydans was isolated from coastal water from Oregon in the United States.

References

External links
Type strain of Aurantimonas manganoxydans at BacDive -  the Bacterial Diversity Metadatabase

Hyphomicrobiales
Bacteria described in 2011